Semagystia pljustchi is a moth in the family Cossidae. It was described by Yakovlev in 2007. It is found in Kazakhstan and Kyrgyzstan.

The length of the forewings is 11–14 mm. The forewings are brown with a yellowish border with brown spots at the veins. The hindwings are brown with a narrow light border.

References

Natural History Museum Lepidoptera generic names catalog

Cossinae
Moths described in 2007